Eduard Krebsbach (8 August 1894 – 28 May 1947) was a former German physician and SS doctor in the Nazi concentration camp in Mauthausen from July 1941 to August 1943. He was executed for atrocities committed at the Mauthausen camp.

Concentration camp career
In the autumn of 1941, Krebsbach became Standortarzt (garrison doctor) of Mauthausen concentration camp, tasked with supervising medical care and  all medical personnel of the camp. He was responsible for initiating mass killing by lethal injection to the heart of handicapped and sick prisoners. Under his supervision approximately 900 Russian, Polish and Czech prisoners were murdered by lethal injections of gasoline and phenol. Because of this, inmates nicknamed him 'Dr. Spritzbach' (Dr. Injection). Krebsbach was also responsible for the construction of a gas chamber in the basement of the hospital in the Mauthausen camp.

Krebsbach often inspected the prisoners and conducted selections for execution. A former inmate recalled Krebsbach's actions during such an inspection: 

Krebsbach was transferred to the Kaiserwald concentration camp in Latvia during the autumn of 1943. The reason for his transfer is believed to be his shooting of Josef Breitenfellner, a vacationing German soldier, who awoke Krebsbach from his sleep on 22 May 1943. While at Kaiserwald, Krebsbach conducted selections of camp inmates for execution, by forcing the prisoners to perform physical exercises to determine their strength and then identifying the 2000 weakest to be killed.

Following the camp's closure, Krebsbach resumed a career as “Epidemic Inspector for Latvia, Estonia and Lithuania”. Soon after, he transferred to the regular army as a senior staff doctor, serving until late 1944. However this was short lived and at the end of 1944 he left the army and worked once again as a company doctor in a spinning mill in Kassel.

Dachau War Crime Trial

Following the end of World War II he was arrested, convicted of war crimes, and sentenced to death during the Mauthausen trial conducted by the US military on 13 May 1946 and was executed by hanging on 28 May 1947 at Landsberg Prison in Landsberg am Lech.

The following is from the court record of the Dachau trials (quoted in Hans Maršálek, "Die Geschichte des Konzentrationslagers Mauthausen", p. 174):

Literature 
Ernst Klee: Auschwitz, die NS-Medizin und ihre Opfer. 3. Auflage. S. Fischer Verlag, Frankfurt am Main, 1997, .
 Ernst Klee: Das Personenlexikon zum Dritten Reich: Wer war was vor und nach 1945. Fischer-Taschenbuch-Verlag, Frankfurt am Main 2007, .
 Hans Marsalek: Geschichte des Konzentrationslagers Mauthausen. Österreichische Lagergemeinschaft Mauthausen, Wien, 1980.
 Review and Recommendations of the Deputy Judge Advocate for War Crimes: United States of America vs. Hans Altfuldisch et al. - Case No. 000.50.5 Original document Mauthausen war crimes (pdf), 30. April 1947, in English.
 Florian Freund: Der Dachauer Mauthausenprozess, in: Dokumentationsarchiv des österreichischen Widerstandes. Jahrbuch 2001, Wien 2001, S. 35–66

References

External links 

Mauthausen Memorial: SS-site physician Dr. Eduard Krebsbach

1894 births
1947 deaths
Holocaust perpetrators in Austria
Holocaust perpetrators in Latvia
Auschwitz concentration camp personnel
Mauthausen concentration camp personnel
Kaiserwald concentration camp personnel
Mauthausen Trial executions
Nazi human subject research
Executed people from North Rhine-Westphalia
Physicians in the Nazi Party
SS-Obersturmbannführer
Physicians from Bonn
People from the Rhine Province
Waffen-SS personnel
Executed mass murderers